The first season of the Australian police-drama Blue Heelers premiered on the Seven Network on 10 September 1993 and aired on Tuesday nights at 7:30 PM. The 45-episode season concluded on 22 November 1994. The show was a success, and by the end of its 45-episode first season the PJ-Maggie shippers had quickly amassed. It had an average rating of 2.5 Million and going to 3.5 million at its peak.

Its main cast included John Wood, Julie Nihill, Martin Sacks. Lisa McCune, William McInnes, Grant Bowler, Ann Burbrook, and Damian Walshe-Howling.

Casting 
Main cast for this season consisted of:
 John Wood as Sergeant Tom Croydon [full season]
 Julie Nihill as Christine 'Chris' Riley [full season]
 Martin Sacks as Detective Senior Constable Patrick Joseph 'P.J.' Hasham [full season]
 Lisa McCune as Constable Margaret 'Maggie' Doyle [full season]
 William McInnes as Senior Constable Nicholas 'Nick' Schultz [full season]
 Grant Bowler as Constable Wayne Patterson [full season]
 Ann Burbrook as Roz Patterson [until episode 30]
 Damian Walshe-Howling as Probationary Constable Adam Cooper [from episode 34]

Ann Burbrook was originally cast as Maggie Doyle and Lisa McCune as Roz Patterson but the two swapped roles to avoid being typecast in the future.

William McInnes was originally cast as PJ Hasham and Martin Sacks as Nick Schultz but the two swapped roles because McInnes "looked more like a Schultz".

Roz was written out of the show before season's end, because the producers thought that they could do more with another police character, rather than a civilian. This allowed for the introduction of Adam Cooper to the group.

Semi-regular cast members for this season include:
 Peta Doodson as Sergeant Monica Draper
 Beth Buchanan as Susan Croydon
 Michael Isaacs as Clancy Freeman
 Suzi Dougherty as Dr. Mel Carter
 Axl Taylor as Len the barman
 Dennis Miller as Ex-Sergeant Pat Doyle
 Nick Waters as Acting Inspector → Inspector Ted Faulkner
 Helen Trenos as Celia Donald
 Dale Stevens as Senior Constable Rose Egan
 Jennifer Botica as Detective Senior Constable Hilary Edmunds

Notable guest stars for the season include:
 Radha Mitchell as Sally-Anne
 Gerard Kennedy as John Eagan,
 Brett Swain as Peter Sutcliffe
 Kate Keltie as Sally Lamont 
 Peter Hosking as Frank Davis
 Anne Phelan as Mrs. Brady 
 Petra Jared as Kim Stewart 
 Charles 'Bud' Tingwell as Hayes 
 Lois Collinder as Mrs. Rivers  
 Raelee Hill as Jill Lambert 
 Libby Tanner as Heather 
 Lois Ramsay as Eileen Heart 
 Ian Smith as Clive Burton 
 David Wenham as William Cassidy 
 Rex Hunt as Ben Murphy
 Janet Andrewartha as Bridget Ryan
Tony Briggs as Tony Dixon

Plot
At the start of the season, we meet young city constable, Maggie Doyle, who is arriving at her posting in the small country town of Mount Thomas. At Mount Thomas police station we also meet the officer in charge, Sergeant Tom Croydon, who runs "his" station with an almost grandfatherly watch over his co-workers. We also meet Constable Wayne Patterson, who we find had a short romance with Maggie while they attended the Victoria Police Academy together; much to Maggie's surprise, he is now married to Roz Patterson. We also meet Senior Constable Nicholas 'Nick' Schultz, a sarcastic and yet good-hearted cop, and Senior Detective Patrick Joseph "P.J." Hasham, a charismatic and somewhat chauvinistic detective who soon found himself very interested in Maggie. At the local pub, The Imperial, we meet Chris Riley, a local woman who knows all the ins-and-outs of Mount Thomas.

During the season, we see Roz assisting the Heelers and later getting a job at the station as the administration officer. We also see the extent of Roz and Wayne's marriage problems which, when brought to a head when Roz witnesses a shooting over the telephone, results in the end of their marriage and Roz leaving Mount Thomas and returning to her home in Melbourne. This marriage dissolution is a result of many pressures which Roz and Wayne are placed under as a result of Wayne's dangerous job. This includes his being shot and left for dead by two criminals and Roz's somewhat intense jealousy for Maggie. Roz's absence opens up a place for ambitious and contentious young cop, Constable Adam Cooper, whose "breaking-in" at Mount Thomas is anything but smooth, particularly with Wayne who develops quite a disdain for him. Keeping with the theme of family problems, we see how Tom's family problems, including problems with his two daughters, develop. These are only made worse with the death of Tom's wife, Nell, as a result of a car accident. Tom, as a superior police officer, has to learn to deal to separate his personal and professional lives. He is increasingly finding it harder and harder when he has to deal with his friends and family when it is them that have committed offences. PJ has to deal with an old flame, Hilary Edmunds, when she arrives in town as part of the livestock squad, investigating farming issues in Mount Thomas. Maggie also finds romance in Mount Thomas with a shifty detective, Sean Neale, and she has trust issues when she discovers that her beloved boyfriend may, in fact, be a criminal. Maggie also discovers she has relationship problems with her father, Sergeant Pat Doyle. It is also revealed that Nick is carrying a huge secret: his wife and daughter, as well as half of his family, were killed in a car crash. This is revealed to be the reason Nick joined highway patrol and the reason for his stance against vehicle offences such as speeding and drink driving.

Reception 
The show quickly had an average Rating of 2.5 Million and going to 3.5 million at its peak.

The writers and Southern Star didn't expect the show to go anywhere but it quickly amassed to being a #1 Hit series for a number of years up unto 2003-2004 where the drama shows were beginning to fall down in ratings because the CSI franchise became more popular than drama shows since 2001, which caused the cancellation of the show in 2006. The show had 510 episodes out of the thirteen seasons and 12 years since it aired.

Awards

Episodes

DVD release

References

General
 Zuk, T. Blue Heelers: 1994 episode guide, Australian Television Information Archive. Retrieved 1 August 2007.
 TV.com editors. Blue Heelers Episode Guide - Season 1, TV.com. Retrieved 1 August 2007.
Specific

Blue Heelers seasons
1993 Australian television seasons
1994 Australian television seasons